Almondbury is a village and an unparished area in the metropolitan borough of Kirklees, West Yorkshire, England.  Almondbury ward contains 118 listed buildings that are recorded in the National Heritage List for England.  Of these, one is listed at Grade I, the highest of the three grades, four are at Grade II*, the middle grade, and the others are at Grade II, the lowest grade.  The ward contains the village of Almondbury, the district of Moldgreen, and the surrounding area.  Most of the listed buildings are houses and associated structures, cottages, farmhouses and farm buildings.  Many of the houses were used in the domestic textile industry, and have long ranges of mullioned windows, especially in the upper storeys.  The other listed buildings include a church and associated structures, a cross socket, textile mills, a mounting block, a public house, a police box, and a telephone kiosk.


Key

Buildings

References

Citations

Sources

Lists of listed buildings in West Yorkshire
Buildings and structures in Huddersfield